The Communauté de communes du Val Briard is a communauté de communes in the Seine-et-Marne département and in the Île-de-France région of France. It was formed on 1 January 2017 by the merger of the former Communauté de communes de la Brie Boisée, Communauté de communes du Val Bréon, Communauté de communes Les Sources de l'Yerres and the commune Courtomer. In July 2017, the communes Ferrières-en-Brie and Pontcarré left the communauté de communes du Val Briard and joined the Communauté d'agglomération de Marne et Gondoire. Its seat is in Les Chapelles-Bourbon. Its area is 333.0 km2, and its population was 28,266 in 2019.

Composition
It consists of 21 communes:

Bernay-Vilbert
La Chapelle-Iger
Les Chapelles-Bourbon
Châtres
Courpalay
Courtomer
Crèvecœur-en-Brie
Favières
Fontenay-Trésigny
La Houssaye-en-Brie
Liverdy-en-Brie
Lumigny-Nesles-Ormeaux
Marles-en-Brie
Mortcerf
Neufmoutiers-en-Brie
Pécy
Le Plessis-Feu-Aussoux
Presles-en-Brie
Rozay-en-Brie
Vaudoy-en-Brie
Voinsles

References 

Val Briard
Val Briard